This is a list of people who have served as Custos Rotulorum of Dorset.

 Sir Thomas Arundell bef. 1547–1552
 Thomas Howard, 1st Viscount Howard of Bindon bef. 1558–1582
 Sir Matthew Arundell bef. 1584–1598
 Sir Walter Raleigh 1599–1603?
 Thomas Howard, 3rd Viscount Howard of Bindon bef. 1605–1611
 Theophilus Howard, Lord Howard de Walden bef. 1621–1640
Francis Cottington, 1st Baron Cottington 1640–1652
Denzil Holles, 1st Baron Holles 1641–1680 jointly with
John Digby, 1st Earl of Bristol 1642–1653
 John Digby, 3rd Earl of Bristol 1680–1698
For later custodes rotulorum, see Lord Lieutenant of Dorset.

References
Institute of Historical Research - Custodes Rotulorum 1544-1646
Institute of Historical Research - Custodes Rotulorum 1660-1828

Dorset